Hemigrammus bleheri is a species of characin found in Amazon Basin in Brazil and Peru. One of three species called rummy-nose tetra, but is also called  firehead tetra according to FishBase. Reaching a standard length of 2" (5 cm) it is a common species found in the aquarium trade although often potentially hybridised with the other collective rummy-nose tetra species Hemigrammus rhodostomus and Petitella georgiae; the false rummy-nose tetra.

Etymology 
Binomial, bleheri, honouring the species’ discoverer, Heiko Bleher.

Distribution 
This species is found in the Rio Negro and Rio Meta basins.

Diet 
Omnivorous and will accept just about anything offered. Species does have a small mouth so correspondingly sized foods are best. Feed a mixture of dried flakes and granules and small live and frozen foods. A varied diet such as this is essential for the best colour development.

References

Tetras
Taxa named by Jacques Géry
Taxa named by Volker Mahnert
Fish described in 1986